Kenneth 'Richard' Knight (born 18 May 1928) was a British rower. He competed in the men's coxed four event at the 1960 Summer Olympics. He represented England and won two bronze medals in the coxed four and eights at the 1962 British Empire and Commonwealth Games in Perth, Western Australia.

References

1928 births
Living people
British male rowers
Olympic rowers of Great Britain
Rowers at the 1960 Summer Olympics
Rowers from Greater London
Commonwealth Games medallists in rowing
Rowers at the 1962 British Empire and Commonwealth Games
Commonwealth Games bronze medallists for England
Medallists at the 1962 British Empire and Commonwealth Games